Ryd is a city district in Linköping, Sweden, best known for housing the bulk of the Linköping University (Linköpings Universitet, LiU) student body. They live in houses specifically assigned to LiU's students. Many of these homes are in the form of corridor rooms, where students have their own bedroom with an en-suite bathroom but a shared kitchen. The architecture of Ryd is typical of the Million Programme housing project of 1965–1974, one exception being the manor-like Ryds Herrgård (a.k.a. Herrgår'n or simply HG) which serves as a student pub/club.

It also had offices of Studentbostäder & Stångåstaden, where studentbostäder mainly helps the students for giving accommodation and Vårdcentralen (Medical Clinic). Ryd also has Rydcentrum, a retail space that includes Hemköp, where people can buy their household (food items), a pharmacy, a bicycle and key shop, a florist, a bakery, a small pizzeria outlet and a Chinese - Thai restaurant. Ryd also has a bus connection, where people can go to the Resecentrum (travel centre). Residents of Ryd are often heard speaking of Student Ryd (Swedish Studentryd) and the predominantly non-student Human Ryd (Människoryd) as two separate areas of the district. In 2012, 33% of the inhabitants of Ryd were born outside of Sweden.

There are two primary rental agencies that provide accommodations in Ryd. Stångåstaden requires applicants to register into a queue and accrue points in order to apply for rentals outside the student area. People who have not accrued enough point will not have the opportunity to get an apartment. Victoria Park rents accommodations in the southeast region of Ryd, and does not require queueing for points. Rents for comparable units are typically higher when renting from Victoria Park than from Stångåstaden, but because no point accrual is required it can be the only option for someone desiring to live in Ryd.

References

External links

FR Ryd Association for tenants in Student Ryd
RydKarta An online map of Ryd
Ryds Herrgård

Geography of Linköping
Neighbourhoods in Sweden